The 2004 Northwestern Wildcats football team represented Northwestern University during the 2004 NCAA Division I-A football season. They played their home games at Ryan Field and participated as members of the Big Ten Conference. They were coached by Randy Walker.  Despite finishing the season bowl eligible and fourth in the conference standings, the team was not invited to a bowl game.

Schedule

Roster

Game summaries

Ohio State

Source: ESPN

Purdue

References

External links
 NU Athletics 2004 Team Statistics

Northwestern
Northwestern Wildcats football seasons
Northwestern Wildcats football